Lee Edward Stempniak (born February 4, 1983) is an American former professional ice hockey forward who played the National Hockey League (NHL). He played for the St. Louis Blues, Toronto Maple Leafs, Phoenix Coyotes, Calgary Flames, Pittsburgh Penguins, New York Rangers, Winnipeg Jets, New Jersey Devils, Boston Bruins and Carolina Hurricanes.

Stempniak graduated from St. Francis High School in Athol Springs, New York, in 2001, and played his college hockey at Dartmouth College in New Hampshire. A well-traveled and versatile forward, Stempniak has played for ten different teams in his NHL career, which is tied for the second-most in NHL history. On October 1, 2019 after 14 seasons in the NHL he announced his retirement.

Early life
Stempniak lived near an ice hockey rink where he knew the owner. The owner would let him practice whenever he could. After high school, he wanted to continue to play hockey, but his parents wanted him to go to college. Stempniak went to the only college that showed interest in him, Dartmouth. At Dartmouth, he majored in economics. He became a top player for the Big Green ice hockey team and was named a two-time All American, as well as his team's captain.

Playing career

St. Louis Blues
Stempniak was drafted by the St. Louis Blues in the fifth round, 148th overall, at the 2003 NHL Entry Draft. He led the team in goals in his first full season (2006–07), with 27, despite being just 23 years of age. He and David Backes joined Jay McClement to form one of the NHL's youngest lines.

Toronto Maple Leafs
On November 24, 2008, Stempniak was traded to the Toronto Maple Leafs in exchange for Alexander Steen and Carlo Colaiacovo. Stempniak wore number 12 in Toronto.

Phoenix Coyotes
On March 3, 2010, Stempniak was traded to the Phoenix Coyotes for Matt Jones and a fourth- and seventh-round draft pick 2010. Twelve days later, Stempniak was named the NHL’s Second Star of the Week, scoring five goals in three games, all in victories for the Coyotes. On April 1, 2010, Stempniak earned the NHL's Player of the Month honor for March after scoring 13 goals since the trade to Phoenix.

On August 30, 2010, Stempniak signed a two-year contract extension with the Coyotes.

Calgary Flames
On August 29, 2011, the Coyotes traded Stempniak to the Calgary Flames for Daymond Langkow. He went on to record 14 goals with 14 assists during 61 games in 2011–12. On June 29, 2012, Stempniak re-signed with the Flames on a two-year, $5 million deal.

Pittsburgh Penguins
During the 2013–14 season, on March 5, 2014, Stempniak was dealt at the NHL trade deadline to the Pittsburgh Penguins for a third-round draft pick. In 21 games with the club, Stempniak recorded 11 points. He also had three points in 13 playoff games as the Penguins would lose in Round 2 against the New York Rangers.

New York Rangers
On July 19, 2014, Stempniak agreed to join his sixth NHL team, signing a one-year contract as a free agent with the New York Rangers. In the 2014–15 season, Stempniak was primarily used by the Rangers in a bottom six role, compiling nine goals and 18 points in 53 games.

Winnipeg Jets
On March 1, 2015, Stempniak was traded to the Winnipeg Jets in exchange for Carl Klingberg.

Stempniak scored the first playoff goal in Winnipeg since 1996 when he beat Anaheim's Frederik Andersen in the first period of Game 3 of the Western Conference Quarter Finals for a 1-0 Jets lead.

New Jersey Devils
On September 16, 2015, Stempniak agreed to join the New Jersey Devils on a professional tryout. He was signed by the Devils to a one-year contract worth $850,000 on October 3, 2015. In the 2015–16 season, Stempniak made a seamless transition to provide instant value to the Devils. In a scoring role, Stempniak was leading the Devils with 41 points in 63 games, having his best offensive season since 2010.

Boston Bruins
Stempniak was traded for a third consecutive season at the trade deadline to the Boston Bruins in exchange for a second-round and fourth-round pick on February 29, 2016. Stempniak finished out the season scoring 10 points in 19 games.

Carolina Hurricanes
Unable to help the Bruins into the post-season, Stempniak familiarly approached the off-season as a free agent. Following a successful individual year, on July 1, 2016, Stempniak was promptly signed to a two-year contract to join his tenth NHL club, the Carolina Hurricanes.

Return to Boston
Stempniak joined the Boston Bruins during the start of training camp, signing a Professional Tryout (PTO) contract on September 10, 2018. Stempniak began the 2018–19 without a contract, however continued to train with the Bruins at times throughout the first months of the season. While continuing informally with the team, Stempniak belatedly signed a professional try-out contract in the AHL to join affiliate, the Providence Bruins, on February 15, 2019. After 4 games with Providence, and ahead of the NHL trade deadline, Stempniak signed a one-year, one-way contract with Boston on February 24, 2019.

Career statistics

Regular season and playoffs

International

Awards and honors

References

External links
 

1983 births
Living people
American men's ice hockey right wingers
American people of Slavic descent
Boston Bruins players
Calgary Flames players
Carolina Hurricanes players
Charlotte Checkers (2010–) players
Dartmouth Big Green men's ice hockey players
Ice hockey people from Buffalo, New York
New Jersey Devils players
New York Rangers players
Peoria Rivermen (AHL) players
Phoenix Coyotes players
Pittsburgh Penguins players
Providence Bruins players
St. Louis Blues draft picks
St. Louis Blues players
Toronto Maple Leafs players
Winnipeg Jets players
AHCA Division I men's ice hockey All-Americans